David Lindsay "Lin" Clugston (5 February 1908 – 27 September 1993) was an Irish amateur cricketer who played in six first-class cricket matches for Warwickshire, three of them in 1928 and the other three in 1946. He was born in Belfast and died in Birmingham.

As a cricketer, Clugston was a lower-order left-handed batsman and slow left-arm orthodox spin bowler. He had little success in either of his two forays into first-class cricket: as a batsman, his highest score was just 17 and as a bowler he took only four wickets across six games. He was prominent in Midlands club cricket for many years and played for The Forty Club, which takes cricket into schools, into his 60s. At Edgbaston Cricket Ground, he was for many years to 1988 the "stentorian-voiced" public address announcer: Wisden Cricketers' Almanack noted, in its obituary of him in 1994, that he "would upbraid small boys for the slightest mischief in an echoing basso profundo", and that "his successor is still sometimes called the Cluggie".

References

1908 births
1993 deaths
Irish cricketers
Warwickshire cricketers
Cricketers from Belfast
Cricketers from Northern Ireland